The Desert Stormer Stakes is a Grade III American Thoroughbred horse race for fillies and mares age three and older run over a distance of six  furlongs on the dirt held annually in May at Santa Anita Park in Arcadia, California.

History
The inaugural running of the event was on 8 November 1997 as the Desert Stormer Handicap over a distance of  furlongs at Hollywood Park Racetrack in Inglewood, California as the first race on the undercard for the Breeders' Cup program. The event was named in honor of Desert Stormer, winner of the 1995 Breeders' Cup Sprint. The following year the event was moved to the spring meeting and held in late April.

In 1999 the distance of the event was decreased to six furlongs.

The event was upgraded to Grade III in 2001.

However, the event was downgraded to a non-graded stakes after the 2005 Grade III edition.

In 2014 with the closure of Hollywood Park Racetrack the event was moved to Santa Anita Park and continued to be scheduled in June as stakes race with allowances.

The event was reinstated with Grade III status for the 2017 running.

Records
Speed record:
 1:07.75 - Shh She's Ours (2016)

Margins:
  lengths  – Marley's Freedom (2018)

Most wins:
 No horse has won this race more than once.

Most wins by a jockey:
 4 - Mike E. Smith (2005, 2009, 2010, 2017)

Most wins by a trainer:
 3 - Richard Mandella (1997, 1998, 2017)
 3 - Bob Baffert (2006, 2011, 2018)

Most wins by an owner:
 2 - Mr. & Mrs. Jerome S. Moss  (1998, 2009)
 2 - Marsha Naify  (2007, 2010)

Winners

Legend:

See also
 List of American and Canadian Graded races

External links
 2012 Hollywood Park Media Guide

References

Horse races in California
Santa Anita Park
Sprint category horse races for fillies and mares
Recurring sporting events established in 1997
1997 establishments in California
Graded stakes races in the United States
Grade 3 stakes races in the United States